The 1983–84 Oregon State Beavers men's basketball team represented the Oregon State University as a member of the Pacific 10 Conference during the 1983–84 NCAA Division I men's basketball season. They were led by 14th-year head coach Ralph Miller and played their home games on campus at Gill Coliseum in Corvallis, Oregon.

Oregon State finished the regular season at 22–7 (15–3 Pac-10) and won a share of the conference title with Washington.

Roster

Schedule and results

|-
!colspan=9 style=| Regular Season

|-
!colspan=9 style=| NCAA Tournament

Rankings

NBA Draft

References 

Oregon State Beavers men's basketball seasons
Oregon State
Oregon State
NCAA
NCAA